Bučje (Serbian Cyrillic: Бучје) is a village located in the Trstenik Municipality, Serbia. It is on the south side of Zapadna Morava river. The population is 455 (census 2002).

Populated places in Rasina District
Trstenik, Serbia